Olivier Labelle (born July 15, 1985) is a Canadian professional ice hockey forward who is currently playing for Boxers de Bordeaux in the French Ligue Magnus.

Playing career
Undrafted after playing major junior hockey in the Quebec Major Junior Hockey League, Labelle played his first professional season in 2006–07 under contract to the Syracuse Crunch of the American Hockey League .

On July 6, 2010, the Reading Royals re-signed Labelle to an ECHL contract. He was the team's first signee for the 2010–11 season. On November 19, 2010, the Reading Royals loaned Labelle to the Bridgeport Sound Tigers of the AHL.

After two seasons abroad in the Austrian Hockey League with the Graz 99ers, Labelle returned to familiar surroundings in signing as a free agent to a one-year deal with the Reading Royals on September 4, 2014.

Labelle experienced one year in France, playing with Dragons de Rouen of the Ligue Magnus, before opting for a return in a fifth season with the Reading Royals on June 22, 2016.

After another stint in the Ligue Magnus, Labelle again switched back to the ECHL for the 2018–19 season, agreeing to a one-year contract with the Indy Fuel on July 26, 2018. As an affiliate within the Chicago Blackhawks organization, Labelle made 56 appearances to finish with 15 goals and 40 points.

On July 15, 2019, Labelle on his 34th birthday agreed to return to the Reading Royals for his sixth season with the club. In the 2019–20 season, Labelle featured in just 4 games with the Royals before he was released from his contract on October 24, 2019. He returned to former French club, Boxers de Bordeaux on November 6, 2019.

Career statistics

References

External links

1985 births
Acadie–Bathurst Titan players
Bridgeport Sound Tigers players
Dragons de Rouen players
French Quebecers
Gatineau Olympiques players
Graz 99ers players
Hull Olympiques players
Ice hockey people from Quebec
Indy Fuel players
Living people
Manitoba Moose players
People from Saint-Eustache, Quebec
Providence Bruins players
Reading Royals players
Syracuse Crunch players
Utah Grizzlies (AHL) players
Victoria Salmon Kings players
Canadian expatriate ice hockey players in Austria
Canadian expatriate ice hockey players in France
Canadian ice hockey right wingers